Artanada was an inland town of ancient Cilicia and later of Isauria, inhabited during the Roman era.

Its site is located near Dülgerler in Hadim, Konya Province, Turkey.

References

Populated places in ancient Cilicia
Populated places in ancient Isauria
Former populated places in Turkey
Roman towns and cities in Turkey
History of Konya Province